The 1998–99 season was Manchester United's seventh season in the FA Premier League and their 24th consecutive season in the top division of English football. After finishing the previous season without winning any titles, United won the Treble of the Premier League, FA Cup and UEFA Champions League in 1998–99, the first and to date only side in English football to do so. During the campaign, United lost only five times: in the Charity Shield against Arsenal; in the fifth round of the League Cup against eventual winners Tottenham Hotspur; and three times in the league, including their only home loss all season, against Middlesbrough in December 1998. A run of 33 games unbeaten in all competitions began on 26 December at home to Nottingham Forest, whom they also beat 8–1 away from home in February 1999, Manchester United's record away win in the Premier League. The season was characterised by comebacks, particularly in the FA Cup fourth round against Liverpool and the semi-finals of the Champions League against Juventus, but none more so than in the Champions League final, when Teddy Sheringham and Ole Gunnar Solskjær scored in injury time to overturn Bayern Munich's early lead.

Veteran players Gary Pallister and Brian McClair had left the club before the season began, but their replacements (Dutch defender Jaap Stam from PSV Eindhoven and Trinidadian striker Dwight Yorke from Aston Villa) were both signed for club record fees. In November 1998, goalkeeper Peter Schmeichel announced his intention to leave the club after eight years at Old Trafford, joining Sporting CP at the end of the season. The club was at the centre of a takeover bid of more than £600 million from BSkyB early in the season, but that was blocked by the Monopolies and Mergers Commission in March 1999.

Fans and writers regard the Treble as manager Alex Ferguson's greatest achievement. In recognition of his success, Ferguson was awarded a knighthood, and handed the Freedom of the City of Glasgow in November 1999. David Beckham was named UEFA Club Footballer of the Year for the 1998–99 season, and was runner-up to Rivaldo for 1999's Ballon d'Or and FIFA World Player of the Year awards.

Friendlies
Manchester United played four pre-season matches ahead of the 1998–99 campaign, starting with a 4–3 defeat away to Birmingham City. They then went on a three-match tour of Scandinavia, starting with a 2–2 draw against Vålerenga, before comprehensive wins over Brøndby (6–0) and Brann (4–0). After the season began, they also played a friendly against a Europe XI selected by former striker Eric Cantona as a belated memorial to the Munich air disaster, which happened 40 years earlier; Cantona played for both teams during the match, which Manchester United won 8–4. A testimonial for Teddy Scott was scheduled against Aberdeen at Pittodrie in January; United lost 7–6 on penalties after a 1–1 draw in 90 minutes.

Colours: Green = Manchester United win; Yellow = draw; Red = opponents win.

FA Charity Shield

The first competitive game of the season was the Charity Shield on 9 August 1998 at Wembley Stadium in front of a crowd of 67,342, which United lost 3–0 to the previous season's double winners Arsenal. Roy Keane made his comeback after almost a year out injured and Jaap Stam made his debut in central defence.

FA Premier League

August
On the opening weekend of the season, Manchester United faced Leicester City at Old Trafford, and went a goal down within seven minutes, when Emile Heskey turned in Muzzy Izzet's cross via the crossbar. Tony Cottee – the scorer in the previous season's corresponding fixture – added a second with 15 minutes remaining. A long-range shot from David Beckham deflected in off Teddy Sheringham three minutes later, before Beckham himself got on the scoresheet with a direct free kick to salvage a point for the home side, setting a precedent for things to come. The team's first away game followed at West Ham United, but despite the debut of striker Dwight Yorke, United were held to a goalless draw. Beckham, who had become a national hate figure after his dismissal at the World Cup, received a torrid reception by the home supporters, with every touch of the ball made by him jeered at. Bottles and stones were directed at the team bus prior to kick-off. After the game, Ferguson, his players, and the Manchester United staff refused to be interviewed by the press or television.

September
Manchester United recorded their first win of the season on 9 September, beating newly promoted Charlton Athletic 4–1. Yorke and Ole Gunnar Solskjær each scored a brace to overturn the visitors' early lead. The match was marred by demonstrations in and around Old Trafford against the proposed takeover of the club by BSkyB. Obscene chants were directed at chairman Martin Edwards, who had given his support to the merger. A 2–0 victory against Coventry City the following week, thanks to goals from Yorke and Ronny Johnsen, gave United confidence ahead of their UEFA Champions League opener against Barcelona, but a 3–0 defeat to champions Arsenal left the team in 10th place after five matches. This was Arsène Wenger's third straight league victory over Ferguson (four in all competitions); goals from Tony Adams, Nicolas Anelka and Freddie Ljungberg condemned Manchester United to their heaviest away defeat in more than two years. To compound the misery, midfielder Nicky Butt, who had been sent off in the Champions League match earlier in the week, was handed a second red card in the space of four days for a foul on French international Patrick Vieira. United ended the month with a win, beating rivals Liverpool 2–0 to move into fifth spot.

October
A trip to face Southampton at The Dell on 3 October was taken with caution given United's return from Munich in the Champions League and winless record at the ground. United had lost to Southampton on each of their last three visits, including a 6–3 defeat in 1996. Andy Cole was paired with Yorke for only the second time in the season, a tactic that paid off as both got on the scoresheet. Substitute Jordi Cruyff added a third in the 75th minute to move United into second place in the table, four points behind leaders Aston Villa going into the international break. Raimond van der Gouw who deputised for injured goalkeeper Peter Schmeichel at Southampton featured again at home to Wimbledon, a match that Manchester United won 5–1, the biggest win of the season at Old Trafford. Ryan Giggs, Beckham, Yorke and Cole (twice) all scored; Ferguson in particular hailed the contribution of 19-year-old defender Wes Brown. United earned a point away at Derby County on 24 October, and beat Everton 4–1 at Goodison Park on Halloween to cut the gap at the top to just a point.

November
Manchester United failed to score at home for the first and only time of the season against Newcastle United, but made amends with a 3–2 victory over bottom team Blackburn Rovers. Defensive frailties, most notably from Schmeichel, who had announced his intention to leave Manchester United at the end of the season, were on show away to Sheffield Wednesday as the team missed the chance to go top of the table, losing 3–1. A brace from winger Niclas Alexandersson and a debut goal scored by Wim Jonk consigned Ferguson to his second defeat in the league and extended a barren run at Hillsborough; United had won only a single game in their last eight visits. On 29 November, Manchester United hosted Leeds United; Leeds opened the scoring with just under half an hour played, but a goal either side of half-time gave United the lead. Leeds equalised in the 52nd minute, but a moment of brilliance from Butt secured the three points for the Red Devils and kept up the pressure on the challengers.

December
Three straight draws followed in December, the first away to league leaders Aston Villa. United were fortunate to pick up a point given their opponents' dominance in the second half, and were careless at Tottenham Hotspur, throwing away a 2–0 lead. Solskjær put United two goals ahead, but in the 39th minute Gary Neville received a red card for a second bookable offence, tugging on David Ginola's shirt. Spurs captain Sol Campbell brought his team back into the match with 20 minutes remaining and on the cusp of stoppage time powered a header in the top left-hand corner, sparking jubilant scenes at White Hart Lane; despite losing the lead, the result put United top of the league on goal difference ahead of Aston Villa, who faced Arsenal the following day. Chelsea grabbed a creditable draw at Old Trafford to stake their championship credentials four days later and United, who were without their manager Ferguson for the Middlesbrough game were beaten 3–2; it was their last defeat of the season. On Boxing Day, the team collected their only win in the month of December against Nottingham Forest followed by a goalless draw at Stamford Bridge in the last match of 1998 to solidify their position in the top four.

January
A power cut at Old Trafford delayed proceedings against West Ham on 10 January, a match that ended 4–1 to Manchester United. The partnership of Yorke and Cole was starting to click, evident in the 6–2 win at Leicester City. Five goals were scored in the second half – including a hat-trick for Yorke and Stam's only goal for the club – cutting Chelsea's lead at the top to two points. On 31 January, Manchester United moved a point clear at the top of the league for the first time in the season. Yorke's late header in the 89th minute made the 1–0 victory at Charlton Athletic their third consecutive league win (fifth in the month). Ferguson praised the team's resolve, adding, "It's a good result for us, because there are games where you have to dig in and find a result."

February
That winning streak extended to five matches in February, starting with a 1–0 victory at home to Derby County on 3 February to move four points ahead of Chelsea, followed by an 8–1 win against Nottingham Forest at the City Ground; after Yorke and Cole had scored two goals each, Ole Gunnar Solskjaer came off the bench and scored four times in the space of ten minutes to record the biggest away win in Premier League history, a record that would stand for more than 20 years. Ron Atkinson, the manager of Nottingham Forest and Alex Ferguson's predecessor as Manchester United manager, declared Manchester United to be the best team in the league by "a country mile", and Ferguson was now handed a selection dilemma ahead of the clash against Arsenal on 17 February. The Gunners were without Dennis Bergkamp, Emmanuel Petit and Martin Keown, and conceded an early penalty when Ray Parlour brought down Johnsen. Yorke missed, shooting wide of the right-hand post, and was made to pay early in the second half as Nwankwo Kanu's through-ball found striker Anelka, who put his team into the lead. Given Arsenal's defensive record, another clean sheet looked to be on the cards until a header by Cole just after the hour mark drew the game level. From then on, United had several chances to win the game, but a point each left the title race finely balanced. Back-to-back wins, starting with a 1–0 victory at Coventry on 20 February, followed by a 2–1 win at home to Southampton a week later, maintained United's grip on top spot.

March and April
Cup duties were the main priority in March as United played only two league fixtures: away to Newcastle and at home to Everton. Two wins out of two, including two goals by Cole against his former club, Newcastle, helped United become the first team to reach 60 points in the season.

Manchester United could only manage a 1–1 draw at Wimbledon on 3 April as Beckham's well-drilled shot cancelled out Jason Euell's opener in the fifth minute. Despite several of the first-team members being rested for the Juventus tie, United won 3–0 at Old Trafford against Sheffield Wednesday and battled well to earn a point against Leeds at Elland Road after the midweek tie at Juventus; however, the result allowed Arsenal to move to the top of the table for the first time in the season, albeit having played one game more, after scoring six against Middlesbrough at the Riverside.

May
Another victory over Aston Villa on 1 May put United back on top of the league, but Arsenal's win at Derby the next day restored the champions' slender advantage. Against Liverpool at Anfield, Ferguson restored the Cole–Yorke strike partnership, and within 23 minutes the latter scored the opener from a Beckham cross. In the second half, United were awarded a penalty for a challenge on Jesper Blomqvist by Jamie Carragher, which Denis Irwin successfully converted; however, Irwin was sent off in the 75th minute for a second bookable offence just after Jamie Redknapp scored through a penalty to give Liverpool hope. Former United midfielder Paul Ince scrambled the equaliser two minutes from time. The United manager did not hide his discomfort, adding that he thought "the referee handed it to them". On the same night, Arsenal convincingly beat rivals Tottenham to move three points clear, having still played a game more. Wenger was adamant that United were marginal favourites, but it was clear the title race would be decided on the final day, as it had been in 1995.

With three games remaining, Yorke scored his 29th goal of the season at Middlesbrough to help his team return to the top of the table. Jimmy Floyd Hasselbaink's late winner against Arsenal two days later all but ended Wenger's chances of retaining the league championship. United now needed only four points, one of them gained at Ewood Park, in the process relegating Blackburn Rovers, who were now managed by former United assistant manager Brian Kidd. Manchester United eventually secured the championship, their fifth in seven seasons, on the final day; after Les Ferdinand had put Tottenham ahead, goals from Beckham and Cole either side of half-time gave United a 2–1 win that rendered Arsenal's victory over Aston Villa irrelevant.

Colours: Green = Manchester United win; Yellow = draw; Red = opponents win.

FA Cup
 
Despite receiving a home draw in each of their first four rounds (Third to Sixth), United were paired against difficult opponents throughout the competition. En route to the final they defeated four Premier League teams: Middlesbrough, Liverpool, Chelsea and Arsenal. The only team from outside the top flight that United played in the competition was Fulham, who at the time played in the Second Division, the third tier of English football, but even they were not considered pushovers, having claimed shock wins over Southampton and Aston Villa in the previous rounds.

In the third round, United were drawn against Middlesbrough, who had recently beaten them in the league. Andy Townsend gave Middlesbrough the lead early in the second half, but goals from Cole, Irwin and Giggs gave United a 3–1 victory.

United faced Liverpool at home in the following round, where the visitors took the lead from a Michael Owen header inside three minutes. In spite of creating plenty of goalscoring chances, the team failed to equalise until the 86th minute, when Yorke scored after a Beckham free kick was headed into his path by Cole inside the six-yard box. In the second minute of stoppage time, Solskjær hit a shot through the legs of Liverpool defender Jamie Carragher that beat goalkeeper David James at his near post to give United the win.

Cole scored the winner against Fulham on Valentine's Day to set up a quarter-final clash at home to Chelsea. Although there were no goals, Paul Scholes and Roberto Di Matteo were both sent off and missed the replay three days later at Stamford Bridge. Yorke kept up his ever-improving goalscoring record, scoring two goals against the Blues on 10 March.

United played cup holders Arsenal in the semi-final at Villa Park on 11 April. Neither team was able to score even after extra time had been played, although Keane had a goal ruled out in the first half for a controversial offside decision against Yorke in the build-up, and Nelson Vivas was sent off for Arsenal, so the match was decided in a replay four days later. Beckham opened the scoring for United with a long range effort, but Dennis Bergkamp drew Arsenal level with a shot that deflected off United's centre back Jaap Stam. Arsenal then thought they had taken the lead when Nicolas Anelka put the ball in the back of United's net, but the goal was ruled out for offside. United's captain Roy Keane was red-carded for two bookable offences and United played the last half-hour of normal time with 10 men. In injury time at the end of the second half, Phil Neville fouled Ray Parlour in the penalty area. Peter Schmeichel parried away Bergkamp's resultant spot kick and the game went into extra time.

Giggs scored partway through the second half of extra time. Picking up possession on the halfway line after a loose pass from Patrick Vieira, he dribbled past the entire Arsenal back line before shooting just under goalkeeper David Seaman's bar. Giggs ran celebrating towards the United fans, and United held on to beat the Gunners 2–1. The goal was the last ever scored in a FA Cup semi-final replay, as they were abolished the following season.

United met Newcastle United in the final at Wembley Stadium, the penultimate FA Cup final to be held there before it was closed for rebuilding. Less than 10 minutes into the match, Keane was injured and replaced by Sheringham. He and Scholes both finished with a goal apiece in the 2–0 win that sealed the double.

Colours: Green = Manchester United win; Yellow = draw; Red = opponents win.

League Cup

As in the previous four seasons United rested many of their first-team players in the League Cup, instead using the competition to provide first team experience to their younger players and reserves. In the third round of the competition United required extra-time to defeat Bury, eventually winning 2–0 with goals from Erik Nevland and Ole Gunnar Solskjær. In the fourth round, two more goals from Solskjær gave United a 2–1 victory over Nottingham Forest, earning them a place in the quarter-finals for the first time since they reached the final in 1994. United were beaten in the quarter-finals by eventual winners Tottenham Hotspur; two goals from Chris Armstrong and one from David Ginola gave Spurs a 3–1 victory, with ex-Spurs striker Teddy Sheringham scoring the consolation for United on his return to White Hart Lane.

Colours: Green = Manchester United win; Yellow = draw; Red = opponents win.

UEFA Champions League

Second qualifying round

Manchester United began their UEFA Champions League campaign against Polish champions ŁKS Łódź in the second qualifying round. Goals from Giggs and Cole in the home leg gave them a 2–0 win, and a goalless second leg ensured their qualification for the group stage. This gave Łódź the distinction of being the only side to keep a clean sheet against the eventual champions as well as being the only opponents failing to score against them.

Colours: Green = Manchester United win; Yellow = draw; Red = opponents win.

Group stage

United were drawn in Group D, quickly labelled the competition's "group of death", along with Spanish club Barcelona, German champions Bayern Munich and Danish side Brøndby.

Both games against Barcelona ended in draws. Despite Giggs, Scholes and Beckham putting the team into a 3–2 lead at Old Trafford, the visitors were awarded a late penalty after Butt was sent off for handling the ball. Luis Enrique converted the ball into the net to leave both teams with a point on Matchday One. In the return game on 25 November at the Camp Nou, a fixture that Barça needed to win to avoid elimination, Dwight Yorke's goals put United ahead 3–2, but Barça star Rivaldo equalized and nearly scored again but his effort hit the crossbar.

United were denied victory by Bayern Munich twice, home and away. In Munich, the home side equalised with two minutes to go with United leading 2–1, after Schmeichel uncharacteristically went for and missed Bixente Lizarazu's throw-in, allowing Giovane Élber to tap in from a few yards out and score his second of the match. The return leg ended in a stalemate; Roy Keane scored just before half-time via a low header before Hasan Salihamidžić equalised for the visitors.

United inflicted two heavy defeats on Brøndby, beating them 6–2 in Copenhagen and 5–0 at Old Trafford.

Results in the other groups meant that a second-place finish was enough for United to progress into the quarter-finals, joining group leaders Bayern Munich.

Colours: Green = Manchester United win; Yellow = draw; Red = opponents win.

Knockout phase

In the knockout stage United played two Italian sides in the quarter and semi-finals, Internazionale and Juventus respectively; United had never won on an Italian pitch.

In the quarter-finals, Beckham faced Diego Simeone for the first time since the 1998 World Cup. In the first leg at Old Trafford, United beat Inter 2–0 with two almost identical goals from Yorke, both from crosses by Beckham; Simeone's second-half goal was disallowed for pushing. At the San Siro, Scholes scored a late away goal to level the game at 1–1 as United advanced 3–1 on aggregate.

In the semi-finals, Juve's captain Antonio Conte met Edgar Davids' pass to give Juventus an away goal. United equalised in injury-time through Giggs, who converted a Beckham cross: a Teddy Sheringham goal a few minutes earlier had been disallowed. A draw meant that United either needed to win in Italy, or get a score-draw of 2–2 or greater.

In the second leg at the Stadio delle Alpi, Filippo Inzaghi scored twice in the first 11 minutes to give Juve a 3–1 aggregate lead. Team captain Roy Keane, however, who was shown a yellow card preventing him from playing the final, headed in a Beckham cross. Dwight Yorke added a second to level the match just before the break. In the second half, Cole put United ahead for the first time in the match and the tie. Yorke was brought down by the Juve keeper Angelo Peruzzi in the area as he went round him, but the referee played the advantage and Cole tapped in from an acute angle. United held on for their first victory in Italy and booked their place in the Camp Nou for the final, against group opponents Bayern Munich.

Colours: Green = Manchester United win; Yellow = draw; Red = opponents win.

Final

United were without first-choice central midfielders Keane and Scholes, as both were suspended after receiving a second yellow card in the competition. Ferguson reorganised the team, with Blomqvist and Butt replacing Keane and Scholes, Beckham moving from right-wing to centre-midfield and Giggs moving from the left to the right wing. United lined up in their normal 4–4–2 formation. This was the final match for Peter Schmeichel, who captained the team.

Mario Basler's free kick after six minutes opened the scoring for Bayern Munich. Bayern then had the chance to extend their lead with Mehmet Scholl hitting the post and Carsten Jancker the crossbar, forcing Peter Schmeichel to make numerous saves. In reaction to going a goal down, Ferguson substituted in Solskjær and Sheringham. As the game went to injury time, referee Pierluigi Collina indicated that three minutes would be played. In almost the last attack of the game, United won a corner, which Beckham took and goalkeeper Schmeichel went up front for. The ball was partially cleared by the Bayern defence before being played back to Giggs, who sent a low volley into the path of Sheringham, whose scuffed shot squeezed low inside the post.

Almost immediately after the equaliser United won another corner, again taken by Beckham. He landed the ball on the head of Sheringham who nodded it to Solskjær who in turn toe-poked it into the roof of the net. Oliver Kahn, the Bayern goalkeeper, was motionless on the line. United had completed the come-back. Bayern barely had time to restart the game, which referee Collina brought to a close just a few seconds later.

Schmeichel and Ferguson were presented with the trophy by UEFA president Lennart Johansson. Despite their suspensions, both Keane and Scholes received winners' medals on the rostrum. Keane claims that to date he has not looked at the medal, feeling that his absence had tainted the accomplishment to the extent that he "didn't deserve the medal". Substituted Bayern legend Lothar Matthäus removed his runner-up medal as soon as he received it, and later remarked that United were "lucky" to win the final.

Manchester United became the first English team to win the Champions League since it was rebranded in 1992, and the first to win the European Cup overall since Liverpool beat Roma in 1984. Coincidentally, the final was played on what would have been Sir Matt Busby's 90th birthday; he had died five years earlier and never saw the club repeat his achievement of 31 years earlier.

Legacy

Less than 24 hours after the dramatics in Barcelona, a crowd of 500,000 people turned up on the streets of Manchester to greet the United players, who paraded through the city with their trophies in an open-top bus. As champions of Europe, Manchester United played against 1998–99 UEFA Cup Winners' Cup winners Lazio in the 1999 UEFA Super Cup, but lost the match 1–0. On the eve of that game, David Beckham was named as the winner of the UEFA Club Footballer of the Year, as well as UEFA's Best Midfielder award. Beckham was also voted as the runner-up for the 1999 Ballon d'Or and the 1999 FIFA World Player of the Year awards. Manchester United were also invited to play in the Intercontinental Cup against the winners of the 1999 Copa Libertadores, Brazilian side Palmeiras, in Tokyo. Roy Keane scored the winner, making the team the first and last British side to win the trophy before it was abolished in 2004. Having been led to believe it would help The Football Association with their bid to host the 2006 FIFA World Cup, United controversially withdrew from the 1999–2000 FA Cup, the first time the holders had done so, in order to play in the inaugural Club World Championship. They did not progress past the group stage, and Ferguson later regretted how they handled the situation.

Along with the Busby Babes, the 1999 Treble-winning team is regarded by supporters as the benchmark of Manchester United teams. In 2007 The Daily Telegraph in association with World Soccer Magazine published a list of the 20 greatest football teams of all time: United were ranked in last position, behind Liverpool's double winners of 1977. The extra-time winner scored by Ryan Giggs in the FA Cup semi-final against Arsenal topped a poll for the best goal in the competition and Channel 4 viewers rated the team's comeback in the Champions League final at number four on the list of 100 Greatest Sporting Moments.

Winning the Treble is also considered the greatest achievement in the career of manager Alex Ferguson, although he has disagreed with that assessment. In recognition of the team's success, Ferguson was made a Knight Bachelor and also received the Freedom of his home city of Glasgow.

On 26 May 2019, Manchester United and Bayern Munich legends sides played each other in a charity match at Old Trafford to commemorate the 20th anniversary of United completing the Treble. Manchester United won the match 5–0, with goals from Solskjær, Yorke, Butt and Beckham, as well as Louis Saha, who played for the club from 2004 to 2008.

Attempted takeover by BSkyB

In September 1998 Manchester United were the target of a proposed takeover by BSkyB, a subsidiary of Rupert Murdoch's News Corporation. Negotiations between both sides had begun during the summer, but had stalled after disagreements over the asking price. The satellite group's original bid of £575 million – initially thought to be their final offer – was deemed too low by two members of United's board (chairman Martin Edwards and Professor Sir Roland Smith), who pressed for a higher figure. Two days of talks followed and in an attempt to close the deal, BSkyB made a final bid of £623.4 million.

A year earlier, Murdoch's Fox Entertainment Group purchased the Los Angeles Dodgers for $311m. Fox also held exclusive rights to Major League Baseball which meant from a strategic point of view, Murdoch's acquisition looked more appealing. He was now able to control both programming content on his network and distribution rights to the Dodgers. For the very same reason, BSkyB replicated Fox's formula and went ahead with a takeover of a Premier League club. Manchester United thus was the unanimous choice of Murdoch and board members. The club was the most valuable in English football, making £30.1 million from gate receipts and programmes in 1997 alone. At the same time, more than 200 supporters' groups were established worldwide and the club's fanbase exceeded 100 million, despite only a million having been to Old Trafford to watch the first team play. As a means of capitalising on this growing market, MUTV, a television station operated by the club was launched in August 1998. In co-operation with Granada Media Group and BSkyB it was the world's first channel dedicated to a football club, funded entirely through subscriptions. On the pitch United's success was largely down to the nurturing talents of manager Ferguson, who assembled a team capable of dominating in the long haul.

Formation of Shareholders United

When BSkyB publicised their intentions to take over Manchester United, supporters reacted angrily to the news. Many felt the club's traditions, built on a loyal fanbase and the attractive football played under Matt Busby and now Alex Ferguson would be tarnished. United were no longer an independent entity, and major decisions affecting the club looked increasingly likely to be taken on the other side of the globe.

As a means of rallying supporters to get behind their cause, awareness campaigns against the takeover were launched. Red Issue issued pamphlets to fans and demonstrations in and around Old Trafford took place before the match against Charlton Athletic on 9 September. Football fans across the United Kingdom also lent support by lobbying their local MPs into passing a legislation, preventing further sport takeovers in the future.

Perhaps the significance of the protests was the formation of Shareholders United Against Murdoch, more commonly known as Manchester United Supporters' Trust today, by journalist Michael Crick. Working alongside IMUSA (Independent Manchester United Supporters Association), their joint aim was to seek for the merger to be referred by the Secretary of State for Trade and Industry to the Monopolies and Mergers Commission. Both groups therefore submitted papers to the Office of Fair Trading, stressing the importance of why the merger should not be carried out. IMUSA in particular argued that BSkyB's main intention was not that of United's but their already dominant position. Sky Television's relevant market was premium subscription channels and by buying an established Premier League team when they already had rights to the division was purely for financial gain. Moreover, Manchester United's market was on the pitch and an acquisition by a media organisation – particularly one run by Murdoch – may create detrimental damage to the sport in the long term.

Bowing down to public pressure, the trade secretary Peter Mandelson referred the deal to the Monopolies and Mergers Commission in October 1998. The report, finalised in April 1999, found that BSkyB acted selfishly and blocked the broadcaster's bid.

Figures announced during the season named Manchester United as the richest in world football, with a turnover of £88 million for 1996–97, 50% more than Barcelona in second place at £59 million.

Squad statistics

Transfers
Manchester United's first departure of the 1998–99 season was Ben Thornley, who joined Huddersfield Town for £175,000 on 3 July 1998. A day later, Leon Mills signed for Wigan Athletic for an undisclosed fee, and Adam Sadler was released. Two of the club's longest-serving players, Brian McClair and Gary Pallister, also left. McClair had been at United since 1987, and opted for a return to Motherwell in the Scottish Premier League; he had played at Fir Park in the early 1980s. Pallister agreed to return to Middlesbrough in a £2.5 million deal, nine years after he had left them for a £2.3 million transfer to Old Trafford. On 4 November 1998, Chris Casper signed for Reading for a fee of £300,000.

Addressing the loss of Pallister, Ferguson signed Jaap Stam from PSV Eindhoven, becoming the world's most expensive defender in a £10 million deal. Swedish winger Jesper Blomqvist soon followed, completing a £4.4 million transfer in July before Dwight Yorke was controversially drafted in from Aston Villa to become the club's record signing. Dutch striker Patrick Kluivert, who impressed during the World Cup, was on the verge of finalising a £9 million move from Milan, only for talks to fall through. A £5.5 million offer for Ole Gunnar Solskjær from Tottenham Hotspur was accepted, but Solskjær himself turned down the transfer after a meeting with Alex Ferguson.

On 24 March, Michael Ryan signed for Wrexham for an undisclosed fee. A day later, Paul Gibson signed for Notts County, and on the same day, Philip Mulryne signed for Norwich City. On 16 April, Terry Cooke signed for United's cross-town rivals, Manchester City. On 30 June, United released Gerard Gaff and Jason Hickson, the same day that Peter Schmeichel signed for Sporting CP, John Thorrington joined Bayer Leverkusen, and Lee Whiteley departed for Salford City.

United's only winter arrival was Bojan Djordjic, who signed for an undisclosed fee on 17 February.

In

Out

Loan out

References

Bibliography

Notes

External links

1998/99 Season at MUFCINFO.com

Manchester United F.C. seasons
Manchester United
1999
UEFA Champions League-winning seasons